In treatment of sewage one process used is the activated sludge process in which air is passed through a mixture of sewage and old sludge to allow the micro-organisms to break down the organic components of the sewage.  Sludge is continually drawn off as new sewage enters the tank and this sludge must then be settled so that the supernatant (the remaining liquid) can be separated to pass on to further stages of treatment.

Sludge bulking occurs when the sludge fails to separate out in the sedimentation tanks. The main cause of sludge bulking is the growth of filamentous bacteria.

Filamentous microorganisms grow in long strands that have much greater volume and surface area than conventional floc and are very slow to settle. Under certain growing conditions, filamentous organisms predominate. There is little robust scientific evidence that can be used to avoid sludge bulking but what there is indicates that over-loading works, having a carbohydrate rich input and having too low a recycle rate may all contribute.

To avoid sludge bulking some of the flow that enters the reactor can be bypassed, recycle ratio can be increased, lime or soda can be added to the reactor or the re-aeration rate increased.

See also
Anaerobic digestion
Membrane fouling

References

Further reading
 
 
 

Waste treatment technology